Visitors to Kazakhstan must obtain a visa from one of the Kazakh diplomatic missions unless they come from one of the visa exempt countries.

Visa policy map

Visa free entry

Citizens of the following countries and territories can visit Kazakhstan without a visa for up to the duration listed below.

Since 11 July 2020, visa-free visitors can stay for a maximum of 90 days within a 180-day timeframe (counted from the first entry).

Notes

 ID – May enter with a national ID card 
 IP – May enter with an internal passport 
1 – up to 30 days within year period
2 – up to 30 days within 180-day period
3 – up to 30 days, for a maximum total stay of 60 days within any 180-day period
4 – up to 42 days within 180-day period

— residents of Balkan Region have visa free access to Atyrau Province and Mangystau Province for up to 5 days.

Visa-free program
Citizens of the following countries do not require a visa for stays of fewer than 30 days as part of a visa-free policy for countries with the large foreign direct investment in Kazakhstan's economy. The program was initially started on 15 July 2014 providing unilateral visa free access to 10 countries and in July 2015 it was further extended to a total of 19 countries, then to 43 in January 2017 and to 54 in September 2019.

Due to the COVID-19 pandemic, this visa-free program has been suspended three times, almost consecutively, since 17 April 2020. On 4 May 2021, the program was suspended until 31 December 2021, and has been resumed on January 1, 2022. The entry without visa is permitted (including over land).

Visa replacement 
Nationals of the following countries who hold valid tourist visas of Kyrgyzstan are able to visit the border districts of Almaty and Jambul regions of Kazakhstan within the validity of such visa: Australia, Austria, Belgium, Canada, Croatia, Denmark, Finland, France, Germany, Greece, Hungary, Iceland, Ireland, Israel, Italy, Japan, Liechtenstein, Luxembourg, Malaysia, Monaco, Netherlands, New Zealand, Norway, Portugal, Poland, Saudi Arabia, Singapore, Slovakia, South Korea, Spain, Sweden, Switzerland, United Arab Emirates, United Kingdom and the United States.

Non-ordinary passports
Only holders of diplomatic passports of Benelux, Czech Republic, Denmark, Estonia, Finland, France, Germany, Greece, Italy, Latvia, Lithuania, Norway, Portugal, Slovenia, Spain, Switzerland and Vatican City and holders diplomatic and service category passports of Bulgaria, Chile, Croatia, Cyprus, Israel, Mexico, Montenegro, North Macedonia, Romania, Slovakia and United Arab Emirates can visit Kazakhstan without a visa for up to 90 days.  Only holders of diplomatic passports of Egypt, Poland and only holders of both diplomatic and service category passports of Bosnia and Herzegovina, China, Cuba, Hungary, India, Indonesia, Iran, Japan, Jordan, Pakistan, Philippines, Qatar, Sri Lanka, Thailand, Turkmenistan and Vietnam can visit Kazakhstan without a visa for up to 30 days.

Visa is not required for 30 days within 180-day period for holders of passport of United Nations (laissez passer).

Visa-free agreement for holders of diplomatic and service passports was signed with Colombia in December 2019, and it is yet to be ratified.

Visa-free transit program
enter through Nursultan Nazarbayev International Airport or Almaty International Airport
for passengers of airlines of Kazakhstan
hold valid air tickets

The Government plans to extend the visa-free transit program until 31 December 2020, but was temporarily suspended for Chinese citizens in January 2020 due to the COVID-19 pandemic.

The entire plan was terminated on July 8, 2022, and replaced by the new visa-free policy.

Electronic visa
From 1 January 2019 citizens of the 117 countries who have an invitation issued by the Migration Service of Kazakhstan can obtain a single entry eVisa. Electronic visa is available for business or tourism purposes to all eligible nationalities, while eVisas for medical treatment purposes are available for 23 countries. Holders an eVisa must arrive via Nursultan Nazarbayev International Airport or Almaty International Airport.

Future changes
Visa waiver agreements have already been signed with the following countries but are not yet ratified or applied:

 – 30 days within year period for ordinary passports
 – 30 days for diplomatic, service and special passports

In December 2018 it was announced that Kazakhstan and Uzbekistan plan to mutually accept visas from February 2019 but this was delayed. In March 2019 Kazakhstan and Uzbekistan were reported as "set to launch" the joint visa program that could expand to nearby countries. All approvals are in place with only technical and equipment details to be worked out.

Pre-arranged visa on arrival
Pre-arranged visa for a stay of up to 1 month can be obtained on arrival for nationals arriving from a country without a Kazakh diplomatic mission. The fee is approximately US$80, and they must hold an invitation letter and obtain an approval from the Kazakh Ministry of Foreign Affairs. They must enter via one of the following ports of entry:

Aktau Airport
Almaty International Airport
Atyrau Airport
Oral Ak Zhol Airport
Nursultan Nazarbayev International Airport

Visa types

Kazakhstan issues 39 types of visa.

Visitor statistics

Most visitors arriving to Kazakhstan were from the following countries of nationality:

See also

Visa requirements for citizens of Kazakhstan

References

External links

Complete overview of Kazakhstan visa types and requirements

Foreign relations of Kazakhstan
Kazakhstan